Zurobata vacillans is a moth of the family Erebidae first described by Francis Walker in 1864. It is found in the Oriental tropics of India, Sri Lanka, Taiwan and New Guinea.

The caterpillar is unusual in having host plants other than typical green plants. The larva feeds on fungus on dead leaves, several lichens and Coccoidea (scale insects).

Gallery

References

Moths of Asia
Moths described in 1864
Boletobiinae